Sartang-e Shab Kuri (also Romanized as Sartang-e Shab Kūrī) is a village in Pian Rural District, in the Central District of Izeh County, Khuzestan Province, Iran. At the 2006 census, its population was 2,146, in 361 families.

References 

Populated places in Izeh County